Boy From Black Mountain is the third studio album by Beat Circus.  It marks the second release in songwriter Brian Carpenter's Weird American Gothic trilogy.  Several songs on the album were inspired by Carpenter's response to his son's autism, Southern Gospel music, and Southern Gothic storytelling.  Larkin Grimm provides guest vocals throughout the album.  Album artwork was created by Portland artist Carson Ellis.

Track listing
 "The February Train" - 4:16
 "The Life You Save May Be Your Own" - 2:59
 "Boy From Black Mountain" - 5:48
 "Clouds Moving In" - 1:25
 "Petrified Man" - 3:43
 "As I Lay Dying" - 4:13
 "Saturn Song" - 3:27
 "The Course of the River" - 1:45
 "The Quick and the Dead" - 5:00
 "The Sound and the Fury" - 4:11
 "Judgment Day" - 3:55
 "Nantahala" - 3:48
 "Lullaby For Alexander" - 1:59

Personnel
Beat Circus
Brian Carpenter - Lead Vocals, Harmonica, Accordion, Piano, Trumpet, Harmonium
Paran Amirinazari - Violin, Backing Vocals
Jordan Voelker - Viola, Backing Vocals
Paul Dilley - Upright Bass, Acoustic Guitar
Andrew Stern - Electric Guitar, Banjo
Doug LaRosa - Trombone
Ron Caswell - Tuba
Gavin McCarthy - Drums

Additional musicians
Bill Cole - Chinese Suona
Larkin Grimm - Vocals
Julia Kent - Cello
Ellen Santaniello - Voice

References 

2009 albums
Beat Circus albums
Cuneiform Records albums